Edward L. Fusselback (July 17, 1856 in Philadelphia – April 14, 1926 in Philadelphia), was a professional baseball player who played pitcher and catcher in the Major Leagues from 1882 to 1888. He would play for the St. Louis Browns, Baltimore Monumentals, Philadelphia Athletics, and Louisville Colonels. Fusselback was the only player in the American Association to record a save in 1882. Fusselback died after shooting himself, three weeks after his brother, William D. Fusselback, Jr., killed himself.

See also
 List of Major League Baseball annual saves leaders

References

External links

1856 births
1926 suicides
Major League Baseball pitchers
Baseball players from Pennsylvania
19th-century baseball players
Philadelphia Athletics (AA) players
St. Louis Brown Stockings (AA) players
Baltimore Monumentals players
Louisville Colonels players
Philadelphia Athletics (minor league) players
Peoria Reds players
Oswego Sweegs players
Mobile (minor league baseball) players
Memphis Grays players
Hastings Hustlers players
Omaha Omahogs players
Oswego Starchboxes players
Worcester Grays players
Portland (minor league baseball) players
Davenport Hawkeyes players
Terre Haute (minor league baseball) players
Lincoln Rustlers players
Des Moines Prohibitionists players
Terre Haute Hottentots players
Green Bay (minor league baseball) players
Green Bay Bays players